Ernest Philip Alphonso Law CB CVO (26 August 1854–25 February 1930) was an English historian and barrister.

Law came from an old Westmorland family and was a grandson of Lord Ellenborough, Lord Chief Justice of England. The diplomat Sir Algernon Law was his brother and Major-Generals Francis Law and Victor Law were his half-brothers. A Roman Catholic, he was educated at Oscott College and University College, London, from which he graduated BA in 1874. He was called to the bar by the Inner Temple in 1878 and practised on the South-Eastern Circuit and at the Parliamentary Bar. From 1891 to 1896 he was Comptroller and Secretary of the Provident Institution Savings Bank.

An expert on Tudor history, Law was appointed official historian at Hampton Court Palace and given a residence there, The Pavilion, where he lived until his death. He was also a Shakespeare scholar and a scholar of historic gardens, designing the knott garden and the Elizabethan borders of Shakespeare's garden at New Place, Stratford-upon-Avon, where he was a trustee of the Shakespeare Birthplace Trust. He also designed the sunken garden at the Brompton Hospital Sanatorium at Frimley and the garden theatre at Esher Place. He authenticated the Cunningham Papers at the Public Record Office, the 17th-century account books of the Office of Revels which had been bought by the British Museum in 1868.

His best-known work was A Short History of Hampton Court (1897), abridged from his longer histories. He also wrote History of Hampton Court, Royal Gallery of Hampton Court, Vandyck's and Holbein's Pictures at Windsor Castle, Kensington Palace, Shakespeare as a Groom of the Chamber (1910), Some Supposed Shakespeare Forgeries (1911), Dancing on Ice (1911), More about Shakespeare Forgeries (1913), England’s First Great War Minister (1916), The Tempest as originally produced at Court (1920), Mantegna's Triumph of Julius Cæsar, as now hung in the old Orangery at Hampton Court (1921), Commonwealth or Empire (1921), Shakespeare’s Garden (1922), Henry VIII's Great Kitchen at Hampton Court, and Hampton Court Gardens: Old and New (1926).

He was appointed Companion of the Order of the Bath (CB) in the 1920 New Year War Honours and Commander of the Royal Victorian Order (CVO) in the 1926 New Year Honours.

He died at the The Pavilion, Hampton Court and is buried in the churchyard of St Mary Magdalen Church, Mortlake.

His widow Katherine, whom he married in 1890, died at Hampton Court in 1954 at the age of 99. A great beauty in her younger days and a recluse after her husband's death, she was one of the longest residents of the palace.

Footnotes

References
Obituary, The Times, 26 February 1930
Who Was Who

External links
 
 
 

1854 births
1930 deaths
People from Westmorland
Alumni of St Mary's College, Oscott
Alumni of University College London
Members of the Inner Temple
English barristers
19th-century English historians
English art historians
English Roman Catholics
Shakespearean scholars
English landscape architects
Companions of the Order of the Bath
Commanders of the Royal Victorian Order
English male dramatists and playwrights
English male poets
19th-century English lawyers
20th-century English historians
Burials at St Mary Magdalen Roman Catholic Church Mortlake